Teodomiro is a masculine given name which may refer to:

 Theodemir (Suebian king) (Spanish: Teodomiro) (died 570), King of Galicia
 Teodomiro (bishop of Mondoñedo), Roman Catholic Bishop of Mondoñedo from 972 to 977
 Teodomiro Menéndez (1879–1978), Spanish Asturian politician and socialist syndicalist
 Teodomiro Leite de Vasconcelos (1944–1997), Mozambican journalist and writer

See also
 Theodemir, a related given name

Masculine given names